Dactylioglypha pallens is a moth of the family Tortricidae. It is found in Thailand and western Java.

References

Moths described in 1973
Olethreutini